Eileen Holt  (5 April 1931 – 15 September 2007) was an Argentine freestyle swimmer who competed at the 1948 Summer Olympics.

References

External links
 

1931 births
2007 deaths
Swimmers at the 1948 Summer Olympics
Olympic swimmers of Argentina
Argentine people of British descent
Argentine people of German descent
Pan American Games silver medalists for Argentina
Pan American Games bronze medalists for Argentina
Argentine female freestyle swimmers
Pan American Games medalists in swimming
Swimmers at the 1951 Pan American Games
Medalists at the 1951 Pan American Games